Gnilusha is a rural locality (a selo) in Bityug-Matryonovskoye Rural Settlement, Ertilsky District, Voronezh Oblast, Russia. The population was 236 as of 2010. There are 6 streets.

Geography 
Gnilusha is located on the left bank of the Bityug River, 26 km northwest of Ertil (the district's administrative centre) by road. Bolshoy Samovets is the nearest rural locality.

References 

Rural localities in Ertilsky District